Sir Gordon William Wesley Chalk,  (16 May 191326 April 1991) was Premier of Queensland for a week, from 1 to 8 August 1968. He was the first and only Queensland Premier from the post-war Liberal Party.

Early years
The only child of Queensland-born parents Samuel Chalk, butcher, and his wife, Sarah Elizabeth ( Wesley), "Chalkie", as he was nicknamed, was baptised in the Church of Christ (but as an adult gave his religion as Methodist). He attended Rosewood State, Marburg Rural, and Lockyer State High Schools.

Career

Chalk entered politics in 1947 having previously worked as a sales manager at the Toowoomba Foundry. In January 1965, he defeated Alex Dewar 11 votes to 9 to be elected as Deputy Liberal Leader, after Alan Munro resigned as leader and Deputy Premier.

On 23 December 1965, Chalk succeeded the retiring Sir Thomas Hiley as Leader of the Queensland Liberal Party, Deputy Premier and Treasurer in a coalition government with the Country Party led by Frank Nicklin. He did so by defeating Dewar a second time, 12 votes to 8.  He continued in these roles when Jack Pizzey succeeded Nicklin as Premier on 17 January 1968.

Following the sudden death of Pizzey on 31 July 1968, the Governor Sir Alan Mansfield swore in Chalk as Premier on 1 August, pending the Country Party electing a new leader. They chose Joh Bjelke-Petersen, who succeeded Chalk after a week in office.

Chalk continued as Treasurer and Leader of the Liberal Party until his resignation from parliament in 1976.

Political positions

Seats held
 1947–1950 East Toowoomba for the Queensland People's Party and the Liberal Party
 1950–1976 Lockyer for the Liberal Party (resigned)

Ministerial positions
 Minister for Transport 12 August 1957 – 23 December 1965
 Treasurer 23 December 1965 – 13 August 1976
 Premier 1 August 1968 – 8 August 1968

Honours
In the Queen's Birthday Honours of June 1971, he was made a Knight Commander of the Order of the British Empire (KBE).

Personal life
Upon his death in 1991 Chalk was accorded a State funeral which was held at Albert Street Uniting Church and he was later cremated.

References
Notes

Citations

1913 births
1991 deaths
Liberal Party of Australia members of the Parliament of Queensland
Premiers of Queensland
Australian Knights Commander of the Order of the British Empire
Australian politicians awarded knighthoods
Queensland People's Party politicians
Deputy Premiers of Queensland
Treasurers of Queensland
20th-century Australian politicians